Freddie Milons (born June 27, 1980) is a former American football wide receiver. He was drafted by the Philadelphia Eagles in the fifth round of the 2002 NFL Draft. He played college football at The University of Alabama.

Milons was also a member of the Pittsburgh Steelers, Baltimore Ravens, Cincinnati Bengals and Team Alabama.

Early years
Milons attended Starkville High School in Starkville, Mississippi. He rushed for over 1,000 yards  and passed for over 600 yards as the starting quarterback during his senior year.

College career
Milons played college football at The University of Alabama, where he set the school record for career receptions with 152. In 2001, Milons made 36 receptions for 626 yards and three touchdowns.

Professional career
Milons was drafted by the Philadelphia Eagles in the fifth round (162 overall) of the 2002 NFL Draft. He signed a three-year deal with the team on June 21, 2002. He suffered a fractured fibula during the team's final preseason game on August 30 and was inactive for every game during the season.

On August 31, 2003, Milons was traded to the Pittsburgh Steelers in exchange for a conditional draft pick. The Eagles would only receive a draft pick if Milons played in a game for the Steelers, but he was inactive for the entire season and the Eagles did not acquire the draft pick. He was released on August 31, 2004.

Milons was signed to the Baltimore Ravens' practice squad on September 7, 2004, but was released on November 10. He was signed to the Cincinnati Bengals' practice squad on November 23 and spent the rest of the 2004 season on the practice squad. He was re-signed on January 4, 2005. He was waived on August 21. He was signed to a one-year contract worth $80,000 with Team Alabama of the All American Football League on July 26, 2007.

See also
 Alabama Crimson Tide football yearly statistical leaders

References

1980 births
Living people
Sportspeople from Starkville, Mississippi
Players of American football from Mississippi
American football quarterbacks
American football wide receivers
Alabama Crimson Tide football players
Philadelphia Eagles players
Pittsburgh Steelers players
Baltimore Ravens players
Cincinnati Bengals players
Starkville High School alumni